Antoine-Louis Séguier (1 December 1726 in Paris – 26 January 1792 in Tournai) was a French lawyer and magistrate.

Biography
Séguier became avocat du roi in 1748, avocat général to the Grand Conseil in 1751, then to the Parlement de Paris in 1755. As a protégé of Louis XV he was elected a member of the Académie française in 1757, though the only written works he produced were some discourses, mémoires and réquisitoires. An opponent of Enlightenment philosophers, whom he called an "impious and audacious sect" and denounced as "false wisdom", he emigrated in 1790 at the start of the French Revolution and died in Belgium two years later.

External links
Notice biographique de l'Académie française

1726 births
1792 deaths
Writers from Paris
French legal writers
18th-century French lawyers
Ancien Régime office-holders
Members of the Académie Française
French male non-fiction writers